Fitzalania is a genus of flowering plants in the custard apple and soursop family Annonaceae, with all species endemic to Australia. Molecular studies show it to be a synonym of Meiogyne.

Species
Species currently accepted by The Plant List are as follows: 
Fitzalania bidwillii (Benth.) Jessup, Kessler & Mols
Fitzalania heteropetala (F.Muell.) F.Muell.

References

Annonaceae genera
Endemic flora of Australia
Annonaceae